= Alexander Khlebnikov =

Soviet photographer

Alexander Khlebnikov (1897-1979) was a Soviet photographer. He painted still lives.
